The 1898 West Virginia Mountaineers football team represented West Virginia University as an independent during the 1898 college football season. In their first and only season under head coach Harry Anderson, the Mountaineers compiled a 6–1 record and outscored opponents by a combined total of 64 to 23. The team's only loss was to the Pittsburgh Athletic Club by an 18–0 score. Lewis Yeager was the team captain.

Schedule

References

West Virginia
West Virginia Mountaineers football seasons
West Virginia Mountaineers football